Night on Earth is a 1991 art comedy-drama film written and directed by Jim Jarmusch. It is a collection of five vignettes, taking place during the same night, concerning the temporary bond formed between taxi driver and passenger in five cities: Los Angeles, New York, Paris, Rome, and Helsinki. The action in the vignettes takes place at the same time, moving from Los Angeles in the United States to Helsinki, Finland.  The scene in each city appears to occur later and later in the night due to the changing time zones. Jarmusch wrote the screenplay in about eight days, and the choice of certain cities was largely based on the actors with whom he wanted to work. The soundtrack of the same name is by Tom Waits.

Plot

Los Angeles
As evening falls, tomboy cabby Corky picks up Hollywood executive Victoria Snelling from the airport, and as Corky drives, Victoria tries to conduct business on her phone. Despite their extreme differences socially, the two develop a certain connection. When Victoria suggests that cab driving is not much of a career, Corky counters that her dream in fact is to become a mechanic. During the ride, Victoria, who is a casting agent, comes to realise that Corky would be ideal for a part in a movie she is casting, but Corky rejects the offer because she intends to be a mechanic.
The taxi is a 1985 Chevrolet Caprice Classic Wagon.

New York
Helmut, an immigrant from East Germany who was a clown in his home country, has found work as a taxi driver. After dark, he picks up a passenger named YoYo, a streetwise young man who wants to go to Brooklyn. Increasingly alarmed at Helmut's inability to handle an automatic transmission, ignorance of New York geography, and feeble command of the English language, YoYo takes over the wheel. During the drive, YoYo sees his sister-in-law Angela on the street and forces her into the cab to take her back home. Helmut is clearly amused by the vituperation between the two. After Angela and Yoyo depart, Helmut struggles to drive back to Manhattan, muttering "New York...New York."
The taxi is a 1983 Ford LTD Crown Victoria.

Paris
At night, a cab picks up two drunk African diplomats, who mock the lowly driver and find it hilarious that he is from the Ivory Coast. In French, when he says he is ivoirien, they say il voit rien (he can't see a thing). Sick of their insults, he throws them out, forgetting to get money off them. Next he picks up an attractive young woman, who is blind. As she cannot see the colour of his skin, he asks her where she thinks he is from. After a moment's thought, she says the Ivory Coast. Prickly and sexually provocative, she rejects most of his efforts to be friendly, regarding him as beneath her, but he is genuinely fascinated by her and her predicament. So much so that, after dropping her off, he watches her walk beside a canal in the dark and he drives into another car, whose driver angrily accuses him of being blind. The taxi is a 1980 Peugeot 504.

Rome
In the early morning hours, an eccentric cabbie picks up a priest. As he drives, he starts to confess his sins. Much to the priest's discomfort, he goes into great detail about how he discovered his sexuality, first with a pumpkin and then with a sheep, then details a love affair he had with his brother's wife, miming the actions and mouthing the cries. Already ailing, overwhelmed by the barrage of unwanted information, the priest has a fatal heart attack. Unable to revive him, the cabbie leaves him on a bench to be found once it is light.
The taxi is a 1976 Fiat 128.

Helsinki
After an evening spent drinking heavily, three workers, one of whom has just been fired from his job and has passed out, climb into a cab to return home. On the way, the two conscious workers talk about the terrible situation their unconscious friend is in, being out of work and having to face a divorce and a pregnant daughter. The driver, Mika, then tells them all the saddest story they have ever heard. The workers are terribly moved and depressed by the story, and even become unsympathetic toward their drunken, laid-off companion. Leaving him in the cab, they stagger off to their homes. Mika wakes him, takes payment and leaves. Worker sits on the ground, passing neighbours greet him and he replies back. The taxi is a 1973 Volvo 144.

Cast

Los Angeles
 Winona Ryder as Corky (taxi driver)
 Gena Rowlands as Victoria Snelling (passenger)

New York
 Giancarlo Esposito as YoYo (passenger & taxi driver)
 Armin Mueller-Stahl as Helmut Grokenberger (taxi driver & passenger)
 Rosie Perez as Angela (passenger)

Paris
 Isaach De Bankolé as Unnamed Taxi Driver
 Béatrice Dalle as the Blind Woman (passenger)
 Emile Abossolo M'Bo & Pascal N'Zonzi as the African passengers

Rome
 Roberto Benigni as Gino (taxi driver)
 Paolo Bonacelli as Priest (passenger)

Helsinki
 Matti Pellonpää as Mika (taxi driver)
 Kari Väänänen, Sakari Kuosmanen, and Tomi Salmela as passengers

Reception
Review aggregator website Rotten Tomatoes retrospectively gave the film an approval rating of 76%, based on 25 reviews, and an average rating of 6.4/10.

Soundtrack

Back in the Good Old World - Written by Tom Waits and Kathleen Brennan - Arranged by Tom Waits and Francis Thumm
Good Old World - Written by Tom Waits and Kathleen Brennan - rearranged by Tom Waits and Francis Thumm
Cycle-Delic - Performed by Davie Allan and The Arrows (as Davie Allan & The Arrows)- Written by Davie Allan
Summertime Blues - Performed by Blue Cheer - Written by Eddie Cochran and Jerry Capehart

References

Further reading

External links
 
 
 
 
Night on Earth: Paris—Talk the Talk an essay by Bernard Eisenschitz at the Criterion Collection

1991 films
1991 comedy-drama films
American comedy-drama films
American anthology films
1990s English-language films
1990s Italian-language films
1990s French-language films
1991 independent films
American independent films
1990s Finnish-language films
Films set in Los Angeles
Films set in New York City
Films set in Paris
Films set in Rome
Films set in Helsinki
Films directed by Jim Jarmusch
Films about taxis
1991 multilingual films
American multilingual films
1990s American films